Lenah may refer to:

Lenah Cheruiyot (born 1973), Kenyan former long-distance runner
Anna Lenah Elgström (1884–1968), Swedish author
Lenah Higbee (1874–1941), Canadian-born United States Navy military nurse

See also
Lenah Valley, Tasmania, suburb of Hobart, Tasmania
Lenah, Virginia, unincorporated community in Loudoun County, Virginia
USS Lenah H. Sutcliffe Higbee, United States Navy Arleigh Burke-class Flight IIA guided missile destroyer